Terefundus crispulatus is a species of sea snail, a marine gastropod mollusk in the family Muricidae, the murex snails or rock snails.

Description

Distribution

References

 Suter, H. (1908a) Descriptions of new species of New Zealand marine shells. Proceedings of the Malacological Society of London, 8, 178–191, pl. 7
 Spencer, H.G., Marshall, B.A. & Willan, R.C. (2009). Checklist of New Zealand living Mollusca. pp. 196–219 in Gordon, D.P. (ed.) New Zealand inventory of biodiversity. Volume one. Kingdom Animalia: Radiata, Lophotrochozoa, Deuterostomia. Canterbury University Press, Christchurch.

Gastropods described in 1908
Pagodulinae